The following is a list of the MTV Europe Music Award winners and nominees for Best Artist.

Winners and nominees

2000s

2010s

2020s

Statistics
The statistic holder of the 2018 award.

References

MTV Europe Music Awards
Awards established in 2007